Klara Berg (6 March 1925 – 2 March 2011) was a Norwegian politician for the Christian Democratic Party.

Berg was born in Eldalen in March 1925. She served as a deputy representative to the Norwegian Parliament from Sogn og Fjordane during the terms 1981–1985 and 1985–1989. Berg was also a member of Gaular municipality council from 1967 to 1991, and a member of Sogn og Fjordane county council.

Her sister Magny Bell Fossen was also a politician, but represented the Centre Party.

References
Klara Berg at NRK Sogn og Fjordane County Encyclopedia 

1925 births
2011 deaths
Christian Democratic Party (Norway) politicians
Deputy members of the Storting
Sogn og Fjordane politicians
Women members of the Storting